Sannat is a commune in the Creuse department in the Nouvelle-Aquitaine region in central France.

Geography

Population

Sights
 The church, dating from the nineteenth century.
 Two châteaux, at La Ville-du-Bois and at Tirondeix.

See also
Communes of the Creuse department

References

External links

Association Sannat Histoire et Patrimoine 

Communes of Creuse